A-F Records is an American independent record label founded by punk rock band Anti-Flag and based in Pittsburgh, Pennsylvania. It was created to help expose more political punk bands to a larger audience. The label's offices were damaged when a September 2004 flood hit Pittsburgh. Although employees saved much of the equipment and inventory, A-F Records dropped Inhuman, Tabula Rasa, and Virus Nine in the wake of the flood for financial reasons.

They have formerly been distributed on Mordam but moved to RedEye when Mordam was bought by Lumberjack in early 2006.

Current artists
 Anti-Flag
 Antillectual
 All Dinosaurs
 Audio Karate
 Chris Stowe
 Dead Bars
 Devon Kay & the Solutions
 Dollar Signs
 Edhochuli
 Endless Mike and the Beagle Club
 Intro5pect
 Justin Sane
 The Homeless Gospel Choir
 Lawn Care
 A Lovely Crisis
 Rational Anthem
 The Methadones
 White Wives
 Worship This!

Former artists
 Darkest Hour (A-F Records released Archives which is a compilation album featuring the band's first two independent EPs.)
 Destruction Made Simple
 Endless Struggle
 Inhuman
 Inquisition
 Modey Lemon
 Morning Glory
 Much the Same
 New Mexican Disaster Squad
 Pipedown
 Red Lights Flash
 Spanish Love Songs
 Tabula Rasa
 The Code
 The Methadones
 The Unseen
 Thought Riot
 Virus Nine
 Whatever It Takes
 World's Scariest Police Chases

See also
 List of record labels

References

External links
 

 
Culture of Pittsburgh
American independent record labels
Punk record labels